Frank Maher may refer to:

Frank Maher (stuntman) (1929–2007), stuntman and coordinator for British TV shows
Frank Maher (footballer) (1895–1976), Australian Rules footballer and coach
Frank Maher (American football) (1918–1992), American football player
Frank Maher (musician) (born 1934), musician from Newfoundland known for his work on the buttonbox